The Garpel Water is a river near Muirkirk, Scotland. It flows under the Sanquhar bridge and Tibbie's Brig. It flows into the River Ayr.

Rivers of East Ayrshire